"Travelling Riverside Blues" is a blues song written by the bluesman Robert Johnson. He recorded it on June 20, 1937, in Dallas, Texas, during his last recording session.  The song was unreleased until its inclusion on the 1961 Johnson compilation album King of the Delta Blues Singers.

Robert Johnson original version
Johnson's song has a typical twelve-bar blues structure (though as is common in downhome blues of this era, the length of each verse is in fact thirteen-and-a-half bars of 4/4), played on a single guitar tuned to open G, with a slide. An alternate version was recorded the same day (and was considered lost) but was finally released officially on the 1998 reissue of King of the Delta Blues Singers.

Lyrics
The song is well known for the lyric "Now you can squeeze my lemon 'til the juice run down my leg", which was later used by Led Zeppelin in their song "The Lemon Song", from the album Led Zeppelin II. It is likely that Johnson had taken this himself from a song recorded earlier that same year (1937) called "She Squeezed My Lemon", by Roosevelt Sykes.

Led Zeppelin version

English rock band Led Zeppelin's version of this song was produced by John Walters at the BBC studios in Aeolian Hall on June 24, 1969 during the band's UK Tour of Summer 1969. Jimmy Page dubbed extra guitar tracks onto the track (the main track being played on a 12-string electric guitar) and it was broadcast four days later on John Peel's Top Gear show under the title "Travelling Riverside Blues '69", and repeated on January 11, 1970. Page used an acoustic slide guitar for the entire song, while Bonham played triplets on the bass drum.

It was interest from US radio interviewers and fans during Page's Outrider tour that originally led him to negotiate with BBC Enterprises for the song's release. A promotional video clip was also released in 1990, with out-take footage from the band's 1976 concert film, The Song Remains the Same inter-spliced with other footage from the band's archive. The clip also features a railroad montage, and underwater shots of the Mississippi River. The song reached number seven on the Billboard Top Rock Tracks Top 50 chart in November 1990, culled from national album rock radio airplay reports.  In Canada, it reached number 57 on the RPM Top 100 Chart

See also
List of Led Zeppelin songs written or inspired by others

References

External links
"Travelling Riverside Blues" promo video at ledzeppelin.com

Blues songs
1937 songs
Robert Johnson songs
Songs written by Robert Johnson
1990 singles
Led Zeppelin songs
Songs written by Jimmy Page
Songs written by Robert Plant
Atlantic Records singles
Hokum blues songs
Song recordings produced by Don Law